The  (ASGC, English: Academy of NCOs of the Civil Guard) is a training center belonging to the Guardia Civil. It is located in San Lorenzo de El Escorial (Madrid), where training is given in security, technical and military subjects for enlisted personnel joining the non-commissioned officers of the Civil Guard.

The ASGC was opened in 2018. The students of the ASGC are granted, on an eventual basis, and for the sole academic, internship and remuneration purposes, the rank of Sergeant. The standard course for promotion to Sergeant is 9 months, and the average experience of embtrants to the course is 8 years. Since its opening there has been a reduction in applicants to the academy, with over 1,000 fewer applicants in 2019 than when the academy opened.

See also
 Academia de Oficiales de la Guardia Civil

References

External links
 Official website

Civil Guard (Spain)
Military academies of Spain
Education in the Community of Madrid